Draethen is a village in the county borough of Caerphilly, South Wales, and the community of Rudry.

Located on the southern reaches of the Rhymney River within the historic boundaries of Glamorgan, Draethen is bordered by Bedwas to the west, Rhiwderin to the east, Michaelston-y-Fedw to the south east and Lower Machen to the north.

Draethen Woods contain a number of former lead mining sites and surface workings dating back to at least Roman times. The mines once exploited a vein of lead ore that exists in the exposed limestone of the Southern Outcrop in this region. All the sites are presently fenced off, but there are no known access restrictions, making it a popular location for experienced cavers.

The Rhymny Valley Ridgeway Walk, the Rhymney River Circular Walk and the Llwyn Hir Forestry Walk all meet up at Draethen.

References

External links

UKCaving.com - Draethen Lead Mines
Draethen, Waterloo and Rudry Community Council

Villages in Caerphilly County Borough